Radok Lake is a meltwater lake about  long and marked by a slender glacier tongue feeding into it from the west, lying  south-west of Beaver Lake and  south-east of the Aramis Range, Prince Charles Mountains. It was plotted by Australian National Antarctic Research Expeditions (ANARE) from air photos taken by the RAAF Antarctic Flight in 1956. The lake was named for Uwe Radok, Reader (head) of Meteorology Dept at the University of Melbourne, who greatly assisted Australian National Antarctic Research Expeditions (ANARE)'s glaciological program. It is drained by  Pagodroma Gorge in to Beaver Lake. 
Radok Lake is an isothermal and non-stratified Lake, i.e. homogeneous water body.

The cove leads to the narrow Pagodroma Gorge. The name is a composite one made from the names of C. Bain, A. Medvecky, and J. Dart who spent a month at the cove studying the geology of the lakes area during the ANARE Prince Charles Mountains survey in January–February, 1969.

Pagodroma Gorge is a steep-sided gorge 3 mi long which joins Radok and Beaver Lakes. Photographed from ANARE aircraft in 1956. The gorge was traveled by A. Medvecky, ANARE geologist in January–February, 1969. Named by ANCA after the snow petrels (Pagodroma nivea) which nest in the weathered sandstone walls of the gorge.

Glossopteris Gully is a steep-sided, narrow gully on the east side of Bainmedart Cove. It was named by ANCA after the Glossopteris fossil plant found in the upper part of the gully.

Fossil Wood Point is a point of land between Bainmedart Cove and Radok Lake. It was so named because deposits of fossil wood were found on the point.

Further reading 
  Bernd Wagner, Holger Cremer, Limnology and Sedimentary Record of Radok Lake, Amery Oasis, East Antarctica, In: Fütterer D.K., Damaske D., Kleinschmidt G., Miller H., Tessensohn F. (eds) Antarctica PP 447–454. Springer, Berlin, Heidelberg, https://doi.org/10.1007/3-540-32934-X_57
  McKelvey, B., & Stephenson, N. A geological reconnaissance of the Radok Lake area, Amery Oasis, Prince Charles Mountains, Antarctic Science, 2(1), 53–66. https://doi.org/10.1017/S0954102090000062
 Wand U, Hermichen WD, Brüggemann E, Zierath R, Klokov VD. Stable isotope and hydrogeochemical studies of Beaver Lake and Radok Lake, MacRobertson Land, East Antarctica., Isotopes Environ Health Stud. 2011 Dec;47(4):407-14. https://doi.org/10.1080/10256016.2011.630465. Epub 2011 Nov 17.
 K.R. Walker and A. Mond, MICA LAMPROPHYRE (ALNOITE) FROM RADOK LAKE, PRINCE CHARLES MOUNTAINS, ANTARCTICA, RECORD 1911/108

External links 

 Radok Lake on USGS website
 Radok Lake on AADC website
 Radok Lake on SCAR website
 Aerial photos of Radok Lake, Pagodroma Gorge and Beaver Lake
 Satellite image

References 

Lakes of Antarctica
Bodies of water of Mac. Robertson Land